Black Pool is a hot spring in the West Thumb Geyser Basin of Yellowstone National Park in the United States.

The pool was cool enough up until 1991 for dark orange-brown cyanobacteria to grow throughout the pool. When combined with the blue of the water, the pool appeared to be an exceptionally dark green to almost black, hence the name.

An exchange of function took place in 1991, shifting thermal energy to Black Pool and nearby Abyss Pool, causing them to heat up. Black Pool's temperature became hot enough to kill all the cyanobacteria in the pool, turning the pool a rich teal blue color. The pool also had frequent boiling eruptions on August 15, 1991, doming the water to 3 feet and causing heavy runoff. Black Pool remains extremely hot, and is now one of Yellowstone's most beautiful and intensely blue pools. The name of the pool remains "Black Pool."

References

Geothermal features of Yellowstone National Park
Hot springs of Wyoming
Geothermal features of Teton County, Wyoming
Hot springs of Teton County, Wyoming